Patrik Moisio (born February 4, 1992) is a Finnish professional ice hockey player. He is currently playing for Eaters Limburg of the Dutch BeNe League.

Moisio made his Liiga debut playing with Ässät during the 2012–13 Liiga season. In November 2017, Moisio penned a short-term deal with UK EIHL side Coventry Blaze, arriving from Nikko Icebucks.

In December 2017, after his short-term deal with the Blaze came to an end, Moisio signed for fellow EIHL side Edinburgh Capitals.

Moisio has subsequently played for Ukraine's Donbass Donetsk, Polish side Podhale Nowy Targ, Finnish side RoKi and Dutch team Eaters Limburg.

References

External links

1992 births
Living people
Ässät players
Finnish ice hockey forwards
HC TPS players
Ilves players
Nikkō Ice Bucks players
Coventry Blaze players
Edinburgh Capitals players
Podhale Nowy Targ players
Finnish expatriate ice hockey players in Japan
Sportspeople from Turku
Finnish expatriate ice hockey players in Poland
Finnish expatriate ice hockey players in Scotland
Finnish expatriate ice hockey players in the Netherlands
Finnish expatriate ice hockey players in England
Finnish expatriate ice hockey players in Ukraine